A monolith is a geological feature consisting of a single massive stone or rock, such as some mountains. For instance, Savandurga mountain is a monolith mountain in India. Erosion usually exposes the geological formations, which are often made of very hard and solid igneous or metamorphic rock. Some monoliths are volcanic plugs, solidified lava filling the vent of an extinct volcano.

In architecture, the term has considerable overlap with megalith, which is normally used for prehistory, and may be used in the contexts of rock-cut architecture that remains attached to solid rock, as in monolithic church, or for exceptionally large stones such as obelisks, statues, monolithic columns or large architraves, that may have been moved a considerable distance after quarrying. It may also be used of large glacial erratics moved by natural forces.

The word derives, via the Latin , from the Ancient Greek word , from  meaning "one" or "single" and  meaning "stone".

Geological monoliths
Large, well-known monoliths include:

Africa 

 Aso Rock, Nigeria
 Ben Amera, Mauritania
 Brandberg Mountain, Namibia
 Sibebe, Eswatini
 Zuma Rock, Nigeria
 Mount Lubiri, Angola
 Mount Poi, Kenya
 Great Sphinx of Giza

Antarctica 
 Scullin monolith

Asia 

Batu Caves, Selangor, Malaysia
Ahmedabad, Gujarat, India
Bellary Fort, Bellary, India
 Bhongir, Telangana, India
 Madhugiri Betta, Karnataka, India
 Kailasa temple, Ellora. Maharashtra, India
 Namakkal Fort Namakkal , Tamilnadu India,
 Mount Kelam, Indonesia
 Mount Pico de Loro, Philippines
 Mount Pulumbato, Philippines
 Sangla Hill, Pakistan
 Savandurga, Karnataka, India
 Sigiriya, Sri Lanka
 Yana, Karnataka, India
 Gilbert Hill, Mumbai, India
Rockfort, Trichy, India
 The Tsunami Penile Monument, Malé, Maldives
Ekasila, Warangal, India

Australia 
 Bald Rock, near Tenterfield, New South Wales
 Mount Augustus (Burringurrah), Western Australia (NOTE: this is not actually monolith as popularly claimed, but rather a monocline)
 Mount Coolum, Queensland
 Mount Wudinna, South Australia
 Pine Mountain, Victoria
 Uluru, Northern Territory

Europe 

 Kalamos, Anafi, Greece
 Katskhi pillar, Georgia
 Levski G., Sofia, Bulgaria
 Logan Rock, Treen, Cornwall, England
 Monolithe de Sardières, Sollières-Sardières, France
 Penyal d'Ifac, Calpe, Valencian Community, Spain
 Peña de Arcos, Arcos de la Frontera, Andalusia, Spain
 Peña de los Enamorados, Antequera, Andalusia, Spain (a World Heritage Site)
 Rock of Gibraltar, Gibraltar
 Rock of Monaco, Monaco-Ville, Monaco
 Rock Cappa, San Luca, Italy

North America

United States 

 Angels Landing, Zion National Park, Utah
 Beacon Rock, Columbia River Gorge, Washington
 Bottleneck Peak, Sids Mountain, Utah
 Castle Rock, Pineville, West Virginia
 Chimney Rock, Bayard, Nebraska
 Chimney Rock, Chimney Rock, North Carolina
 Courthouse and Jail Rocks, Bridgeport, Nebraska
 Devils Tower, Wyoming
 El Capitan, Yosemite National Park, California
 Enchanted Rock, Llano County, Texas
 Frog Woman Rock, Mendocino County, California
 Great White Throne, Zion National Park, Utah
 Half Dome, Yosemite National Park, California
 Haystack Rock, Clatsop County, Oregon
 Looking Glass Rock, Transylvania County, North Carolina
 Morro Rock, Morro Bay, California
 Quincy Quarries Reservation, Quincy, Massachusetts
 Scotts Bluff National Monument, Gering, Nebraska
 Shiprock, San Juan County, New Mexico
 Stone Mountain, Stone Mountain, Georgia
 Stone Mountain, Stone Mountain, North Carolina
 Tooth of Time, Cimarron, New Mexico
 Wolf Rock, Linn County, Oregon

Canada 
 Stawamus Chief, Squamish, British Columbia

Mexico 
 La Peña de Bernal, Queretaro; claimed to be the world's third largest monolith.

South America 

 El Peñón, also known as El Peñol Stone or simply La Piedra, Colombia
 Pão de Açúcar, Brazil
 Pedra da Gávea, Brazil the world's largest monolith on the coastline
 Pedra da Galinha Choca, Brazil
 Torres del Paine, Chile

Outside Earth 
 Phobos monolith on Phobos
 Mars monolith

Monumental monoliths

A structure which has been excavated as a unit from a surrounding matrix or outcropping of rock.
 Aztec calendar stone "Stone of the Sun"
 The Church of Saint George in Lalibela, Ethiopia, is one of a number of monolithic churches in Ethiopia.
 Coyolxauhqui Stone another aztec monolith
 Ellora Caves - UNESCO World Heritage Site
 Great Sphinx of Giza "The Egyptian Sphinx"
 Gommateshwara statue of  Bahubali at Sravanabelagola, Carnataca, India.
 Obelisks - see this article for a list
 Ogham stones, inscribed standing stones throughout Ireland
 Runestones
 Standing stones
 Stelae
 Stone circle
 Stone of the Pregnant Woman, Baalbek.
 The Stonehenge in present-day England.
 The Longstones or the Devil's Quoits, Avebury, Wiltshire, England
 Architecture of Vijayanagar in present-day south India.

See also

 
 
 
 
 
 
 
  (or inselberg)

References

External links 

 Regarding Uluru/Ayers Rock and earlier representations of it as the largest monolith: GA.gov.au, ABC.net.au, Wayoutback.com.au

 
Sandstone
Geomorphology
Geography terminology